Cameron Allan Botting (born March 10, 1954) is a Canadian professional ice hockey forward who played two games in the National Hockey League for the Atlanta Flames during the 1975–76 season. The rest of his career, which lasted from 1974 to 1984, was spent in various minor leagues.

Career statistics

Regular season and playoffs

External links
 

1954 births
Living people
Atlanta Flames draft picks
Atlanta Flames players
Canadian ice hockey forwards
Des Moines Capitols players
Edmonton Oilers (WHA) draft picks
Erie Golden Blades players
Flint Generals (IHL) players
Hamilton Red Wings (OHA) players
Ice hockey people from Ontario
Niagara Falls Flyers (1960–1972) players
Omaha Knights (CHL) players
Ontario Hockey Association Senior A League (1890–1979) players
Sportspeople from Kingston, Ontario
Tulsa Oilers (1964–1984) players